Trevor Mark Pitman is a Jersey politician who was first elected as a Deputy for St Helier in the Jersey general election of 2008.

Polictal career
Pitman was elected as a Deputy for the parish of St Helier in 2008. At this time he was one of the Jersey Democratic Alliance's candidates.

After losing a libel action regarding a satirical cartoon, Deputy Pitman was declared bankrupt in January 2013, which meant that he automatically lost his seat in the Assembly of the States of Jersey.

References

External links
 Trevor Pitman's blog

Living people
Deputies of Jersey
Year of birth missing (living people)